The Nest is a 1927 American silent drama film directed by William Nigh starring Pauline Frederick and Holmes Herbert. The screenplay by Charles E. Whittaker is based on the play Les noces d'argent by Paul Géraldy.

Plot

A mother discovers her daughter Susan is marrying an insufferable social-climber. Already horrified by the idea, she also finds out her son Martin has gone into a life of crime. She decides to head to Paris to forget about her domestic troubles. She marries Richard Elliot, the executor of her late husband's estate.

Cast
 Pauline Frederick as Mrs. Hamilton
 Holmes Herbert as Richard Elliot
 Thomas Holding as Archer Hamilton
 Ruth Dwyer as Susan Hamilton
 Reginald Sheffield as Martin Hamilton
 Rolland Flander as Monroe
 Jean Acker as Belle Madison
 Wilfred Lucas as Howard Hardy

References

External links

1927 films
Films directed by William Nigh
1927 drama films
American silent feature films
American black-and-white films
Silent American drama films
1920s American films